The 1982 LSU Tigers football team represented Louisiana State University (LSU) during the 1982 NCAA Division I-A football season.

Schedule

Roster

References

LSU
LSU Tigers football seasons
LSU Tigers football